Tommy Thelin (born 22 September 1983) is a retired Swedish footballer. His brother Jimmy is a former footballer and the current manager of Elfsborg.

On 2 November 2019, 36-year old Thelin announced his retirement.

References

External links 
 

Swedish footballers
Allsvenskan players
Superettan players
1983 births
Living people
Åtvidabergs FF players
Jönköpings Södra IF players
Association football forwards
Sportspeople from Jönköping